Dr. Michael E. Dreher, also known as Mike Dreher, is a right-wing Swiss politician, and founder of the Freedom Party of Switzerland (originally "Motorist Party"). He holds an MBA from University of St. Gallen and was an MP from 1987–1999.

Political life 

Dreher champions individual freedom, tax breaks, individual mobility and adheres to the principles of Euroscepticism and Capitalism. He calls for strict regulations on immigration, and prevalence of law and order. However, he does not back the death penalty. In his early days he joined the Free Democratic Party of Switzerland. In the 1970s he served as a secretary of the Neutral Nations Supervisory Commission in Panmunjom, Korea with the rank of a Swiss army captain; he travelled extensively in East Asia and Eastern Europe. In 1979 he was a candidate in national elections for the first time. In the 1980s he created a pressure group under the name "Buergeraktion" (People's Action) and aggressively supported candidates of Switzerland's centre-right majority parties. Dreher countered the rise of the Green Party of Switzerland and particularly rebuked its claims about Forest dieback which he denounced as "lie of the century". His verbal attacks on the "reds and greens" were often rude, and rocked the political establishment of Switzerland. He opposes Swiss EU and UNO membership, but supports membership of Switzerland in North American Free Trade Agreement and European Free Trade Association for the purpose of free trade. In 1985 he left the FDP and founded the Motorist Party. He was a national MP from 1987 to 1999, and joined the Swiss People's Party which took up many of his ideas in 2001. He is publisher of the capitalist magazine "Tacho" that promotes the cause of taxpayers and motorists, and President of the Motorist Foundation ("Auto-Allianz").

Personal 

Dreher is a legal and economic consultant, based in Zollikon, a ritzy Zürich suburb. He is married, and has one son. He is a member of Scaphusia Schaffhausen and an admirer of late US President Ronald Reagan and UK Prime Minister Margaret Thatcher. Almost naturally, Dreher has a flair for cars and a collection of old-timers.

Organization
 Freedom Party of Switzerland
 Swiss People's Party

External links
 dreher.ch
 autoallianz.ch
 Political yearbook
 Entscheid der UBI
 Official biography of the Swiss parliament

1944 births
Living people
People from Schaffhausen
Freedom Party of Switzerland politicians
Swiss People's Party politicians
Members of the National Council (Switzerland)